The men's 100 metre freestyle event at the 2016 Summer Olympics took place between 9–10 August at the Olympic Aquatics Stadium.

Summary
At 18 years of age, Kyle Chalmers defeated the experienced field of sprinters to become Australia's first Olympic champion in this event since Michael Wenden topped the podium in 1968. Rallying from seventh at the halfway turn, he overhauled the field for the gold medal and a junior world record in 47.58. Swimming out of lane seven, Pieter Timmers posted a 47.80 to take home the silver for the Belgians, along with a national record. Meanwhile, U.S. sprinter and defending champion Nathan Adrian barely advanced out of the prelims earlier, but bounced back to earn a bronze in the final with a 47.85.

Leading the race early on the initial length, Canada's Santo Condorelli narrowly slipped out of the podium to fourth in 47.88, just a 0.03-second deficit behind Adrian. British teenager Duncan Scott finished fifth in 48.01 to match his own national record that he set in the heats. American youngster Caeleb Dressel picked up a sixth spot in 48.02, while Australia's pre-race favorite Cameron McEvoy dropped back to seventh in 48.12. Amid the delight of the home crowd, Brazil's Marcelo Chierighini rounded out the field with an eighth-place time in 48.42.

Notable swimmers missed the final roster, including China's Ning Zetao, the defending World champion, and Russia's Vladimir Morozov, who was allowed to compete in Rio, after filing a successful appeal against his possible doping report ban.

Qualification

Each National Olympic Committee (NOC) could enter up to two swimmers if both met the Olympic Qualifying Time (or "OQT"). An NOC with no swimmers meeting the OQT but at least one swimmer meeting the Olympic Selection Time (or "OST") was not guaranteed a place, but was eligible for selection to fill the overall 900 swimmer quota for the Games. For 2016, the OQT was 48.99 seconds while the OST was 50.70 seconds. The qualifying window was 1 March 2015 to 3 July 2016; only approved meets (generally international competitions and national Olympic trials) during that period could be used to meet the standards. There were also universality places available; if no male swimmer from a nation qualified in any event, the NOC could enter one male swimmer in an event.

The two swimmers per NOC limit had been in place since the 1984 Games.

Records
Prior to this competition, the existing world and Olympic records were as follows.

Competition format

The competition consisted of three rounds: heats, semifinals, and a final. The swimmers with the best 16 times in the heats advanced to the semifinals. The swimmers with the best 8 times in the semifinals advanced to the final. Swim-offs were used as necessary to break ties for advancement to the next round.

Schedule

All times are Brasilia Time (UTC-3)

Results

Heats

Semifinals

Final

References

Men's 00100 metre freestyle
Olympics
Men's events at the 2016 Summer Olympics